Transnational progressivism is a concept coined by Hudson Institute fellow John Fonte about an umbrella movement that seeks to take ultimate political power away from parliaments and legislative bodies accountable to national electorates in sovereign states, and to vest it in courts, bureaucracies, NGOs, and various transnational bodies that are accountable only to themselves or to other transnational bodies. In the book "Sovereignty or Submission: Will Americans Rule Themselves or Be Ruled by Others?", Fonte describes key concepts of the movement, its conceptual framework, its ideology, the underlying philosophical tradition upon which the ideology is based, the main protagonists of the movement, and calls attention to the danger that transnational progressivism represents for traditional Western nation-centered liberal democracy.

The term is used mainly by Fonte and other members of a group of American sovereigntists, who came together following the 2000 American Enterprise Institute conference.  John Bolton had organized the conference, entitled "Trends in Global Governance: Do They Threaten American Sovereignty", to reveal how American sovereignty was at risk of being undermined by "globalists"—particularly amongst academia, and in international humanitarian and environmental non-governmental organizations (NGOs).

Fontes said that the forces of transnational progressivism were competing against the traditional nation-centered Western-style liberal democracy, and threatened "individual rights, democratic representation, majority rule, and national citizenship" that constitute democracy. Citing numerous NGOs that were calling for rights for minorities, Fonte warned that these international organizations—frustrated by their inability to enact civil rights policies through the normal processes of liberal democracy in nation states—had turned to global institutions to further their agendas. He said that these seemingly disparate groups—such as the European Union, and the United Nations and numerous nongovernmental organizations—shared a common ideology that he defined in this essay. He warned against a postnational global citizenship that pits the concerns of identity groups against the rights of individuals.

To Fonte, global governance—with its increasing role through international organizations such as the International Court of Justice—threatens to usurp American exceptionalism and to weaken the role of the American Constitution and democracy.

Fonte's use of the phrase is not to be confused with its use by academics in the 2008 edited book, Britain and Transnational Progressivism, where, for example, historian Ian Tyrrell refers to the United States' Progressive Era from 1896 to 1917 during which "transatlantic progressivism" thrived, in the form of the women's temperance and suffrage movements.

Fonte's transnational progressivist movement
According to John Fonte's essay "Liberal Democracy vs. Transnational Progressivism: The Future of the Ideological Civil War Within the West"—published in the Foreign Policy Research Institute's quarterly journal, Orbis in 2002, the forces of post-Western and post-democratic transnational progressivism are competing against the traditional nation-centered Western-style liberal democracy—which includes "individual rights, democratic representation (with some form of majority rule) and national citizenship". This adds a fourth component to politically divisive forces—along with traditional realpolitik that pitted nation-state against nation-state, the clash of civilizations, and democratic versus undemocratic systems. On the one hand are those who adopt a "collectivist continental European approach" and on the other an "entrepreneurial, liberal, Anglo-American style regime".

Fonte perceived humanitarian organizations as a threat to the liberal democracy of the United States, because they seemed to privilege race and gender "categories and divisions" in their "vision of humanity." He concluded that the NGOs had a common ideology and in his 2002 essay he set out to define it. He said that these NGOs had a shared agenda, that he called "transnational progressivism". To him, it is a global movement, calling for change in institutional values so that  "the distinct worldviews of ethnic, gender, and linguistic minorities" are "represented" within dominant social and political institutions.

Fonte began his 14-page article by describing events that led to his decision to investigate the "transnational politics of the future." The first took place in October 2000. In preparation for the World Conference against Racism 2001, fifty NGOs called on the Office of the United Nations High Commissioner for Human Rights to put pressure on the United States to address "the intractable and persistent problem of racism" in the US. Fonte considered the actions of NGOs to be an affront to the "normal processes of American constitutional democracy" with NGOs, frustrated by a lack of success with US "federal and state officials", appealing to an "authority outside of American democracy." The NGOs included Amnesty International U.S.A., Human Rights Watch, the Arab-American Institute, National Council of Churches, the National Association for the Advancement of Colored People, the American Civil Liberties Union, the International Human Rights Law Group, and dozens of others.

According to Fonte, during the 2001 Conference itself, the same NGOs called for the United States to "turn its political and economic system [upside-down]", to abandon its "underlying principles", its "federalism", and "free speech" guaranteed under the American Constitution, while "ignoring the very concept of majority rule." Fonte said that the NGOs, who were not satisfied with the 1994 the United States ratification of the International Convention on the Elimination of All Forms of Racial Discrimination (CERD) because of the numerous reservations the US had applied, were asking America to abandon rights protected under the Constitution. He said that "practically nothing" in the demands made by these NGOs was "supported by the American electorate."

Fonte said that the actions of these NGOs and human rights activists, disproved Fukuyama's 1989 thesis on The End of History .  Following the September 11, 2001 Al-Qaeda terrorist attacks, Fukuyama re-affirmed his thesis that most countries would choose liberal democracy. Fonte countered that this was letting down one's guard against the greater threat, an "alternative ideology" which he called "transnational progressivism"—a "hybrid regime" that was "post-liberal democratic", post-Constitutional and post-American . Transnational progressivism,  an ideology that "constitutes a universal and modern worldview that challenges in theory and practice both the liberal democratic nation-state in general and the American regime in particular."

After analyzing the disparate academics, corporations, NGOs, and transnational organizations, Fonte lists nine key concepts that he includes as part of the transnational progressivism movement. Fonte says that they promote groups of people, as ascribed by their gender, race, etc. over the individual citizen; they create dichotomies with groups of people as either oppressors or victims; their concept of fairness depends on group proportionalism;  they call on dominant institutions to adopt values that take into consideration the perspectives of those they perceive to be victim groups; they support diversity versus assimilation to accommodate the numbers of immigrants changing the demographics of nation-states which Fonte labels, the demographic imperative; democracy itself is being redefined in a post-assimilationist age, so that it no longer will exclusively "reflect the norms and cultures of dominant groups"; they are deconstructing the concept of the nation and national narratives —with statements such as, "we do not need to reinforce sovereignty or a "particularist nationalism", but rather to strengthen the position of humankind"; they promote an "ultranational identity" as "citizen of the world", including the concept of postnational citizenship; and they promote the concept of transnationalism over multiculturalism and/or internationalism.

The demographic imperative, group proportionalism, the deconstruction of national narratives and cultural assimilation, are all related to the changing demographics caused by immigration. He calls the transnational progressivists model, the "diaspora-ampersand" and warns that is replacing the "strong national sovereignty-assimilationist position". These 21st century progressivists call for the shift from the obsolete paradigm of assimilation to one that promotes "diversity." To Fontes, this means representation by "group proportionalism." Fonte is concerned that immigrants, who are not assimilated, contribute to changing narratives about nations states and cites Yoram Hazony's The Jewish State as an example. Hazony says that immigrants—who were not Jewish—accompanying Russian-Jewish emigrants to Israel, gave anti-Zionism considerable support. He is also concerned that non-citizens and ethnic groups will have greater power and status as this movement calls for a change in the "system of majority rule among equal citizens".

He cited the example of the Equal Employment Opportunity Commission, which had extended antidiscrimination protection to illegal immigrants, in his critique of progressives who categorize immigrants as the victim in the dichotomous relationship between privileged and marginalized, the oppressor (white males, heterosexuals, and Anglos) and the oppressed victim ( blacks, gays, Latinos, immigrants, and women). Fonte rejects the progressivist's call for  "proportional representation by group", through which the "victim" groups should be represented in all professions roughly proportionate to their percentage of the population to avoid "underrepresentation." He raised concerns that the transnationalist progressivist movement promoted the "goals" of "identity groups"—the racial, ethnic, and/or gender ascriptive group into which one is born" as the "key political unit"—not the individual citizen.

In the 1990s, Fonte, whose PhD was on world history from the University of Chicago, was directing the committee to Review National Standards at the AEI, under  Lynn Cheney, then-chair of the National Endowment for the Humanities (NEH). He was part of a vocal group of critics of the 1994 National Standards for United States History—the on-going debates have been called history or cultural wars. Fonte said that the Standards altered the "traditional narrative" which featured European settlers to the United States" by including Amerindian and West African histories. This provided a basis for a "hybrid American multiculture", of which he disapproved. The History Standards were rejected, but the narrative predominately taught in American public schools in 2002, was "not primarily the creation of Western civilization", but that of a Great Convergence of three civilizations.

Background
In 2000, the American Enterprise Institute hosted a conference, "Trends in Global Governance: Do They Threaten American Sovereignty", organized by John Bolton in which he cautioned his fellow Americanists against the rise of the "globalists", whom he described as law and international relations professors and other academics, media professionals, humanitarian and environmental groups, including those calling for human rights. By 2000, John Fonte, who was then at the AEI, became part of a group labelled as "new sovereigntists" by Temple University law professor, Peter J. Spiro in his 2000 his November/December 2000, Foreign Affair journal article. According to Fonte, the goal of sovereigntists was to defend the "principle of liberal democratic sovereignty within the nation-state. John Bolton, Robert Bork, Jeremy Rabkin, David Rivkin, Jack Goldsmith, Stephen Krasner, Curtis Bradley, John O'Sullivan, Andrew McCarthy, Herbert London, Jed Rubenfeld, Eric Posner, and John Yoo were prominent new sovereigntists.

Spiro described the "new sovereigntists" as "old-fashioned, conservative anti-internationalists" who continued to influence policymakers in the United States. New Sovereigntists were against "globalista academics". These anti-internationalists were examining the "precepts and the implications of the global-governance agenda" of "leftist think tanks" and humanitarian nongovernmental organizations (NGOs). Spiro described how new sovereigntists say that the American Constitution gives the United States the right to "opt out of international regimes as a matter of power, legal right, and constitutional duty." In 1992, the United States had ratified the International Covenant on Civil and Political Rights (ICCPR) but had little effect on the implementation of domestic civil rights in the US, because it had included an extensive number of reservations. The debate over the potential and consequences over international human rights laws trumping American domestic law was substantial. New sovereigntists consider the "international legal order" to be "illegitimately intru[ding]" in American "domestic affairs"; and that the  international lawmaking system is both "unenforceable" and "unaccountable". In a 2011 International Studies Quarterly, co-authored by Goodhart, the authors described the new sovereigntists' challenge to global governance. The authors acknowledged that, by 2011, the view of the sovereigntists—that global governance" "violates popular sovereignty" by undermining "constitutional governments" and "popular sovereignty" and is therefore undemocratic—was  "widely held".

In similar language, an AEI 2003 article announcing the launching of their watchdog website to monitor NGOs, the AEI warned that governments and corporations in their attempts to win development contracts, have contributed to the proliferation of NGOs, with no accountability, which the AEI call, the "unelected few". The NGOs, they say, have gained "significant influence on policymaking" by demanding that governments abide by the NGOs "rules and regulations" even using "courts-or the specter of the courts-to compel compliance". The AEI warned that the "extraordinary growth of advocacy NGOs in liberal democracies has the potential to undermine the sovereignty of constitutional democracies, as well as the effectiveness of credible NGOs".

John Fonte has many public appearances on C-Span, and numerous publications—including articles in the Claremont Review of Books.  In his October 19, 2016 Clairmont article, entitled "Transformers", Fonte referred to the transnational progressivism movement in describing both then President Barack Obama and then presidential candidate Hillary Clinton who were both working towards their goal of the "fundamental transformation of America".

In his 2011 book, Sovereignty or Submission: Will Americans Rule Themselves or be Ruled by Others?, Fonte again warned Americans that "[t]ransnational progressives and transnational pragmatists in the UN, EU, post-modern states of Europe, NGOs, corporations, prominent foundations, and most importantly, in America's leading elites" were seeking to establish "global governance."

Fonte's list of transnational progressivist organizations
In his theory of transnational progressivism, Fonte and his readers comment negatively on international organizations, including the International Court of Justice, now extant League of Nations European Union, and the United Nations, purported political philosophies such as the cultural Marxism conspiracy theory, as well as related concepts or entities related to the potential of organizations to unite at a global level in a way that they fear would threaten liberal democracy in its current form. This includes discussions of cosmopolitanism, Democratic peace theory, federal world government, federalism, global governance, international politics, multilateralism, national sovereignty, new world order politics, the presidential system, supranationalism, transnationalism, world government, and a world political party. In 2016, Yoo and Fonte, who was at that time the director of the Center for American Common Culture,  that the agendas of transnational democracy—as outlined in a CFR paper published after 2012 United States presidential election when then-President Obama was re-elected—and that of transnational progressivism, are identical.

Responses to Fonte's concept of transnational progressivism
A blogger, Steven Den Beste, introduced Fonte's concept of transnational progressivism in the blogosphere—a term used by the warblog community at that time—in a lengthy detailed post in which he quoted and summarized Fonte's article extensively. In Den Beste's "U.S.S. Clueless" blog that he had published for several years in the early 2000s, he wrote that the underlying political philosophy behind "apparently disparate phenomena", such as the anti-globalization movement, the sustainable development movement, the International Court of Justice,  multiculturalism, international human rights organizations, the European Union, the European Commission and other "elitists"—those Beste called, the "Berkeley Liberals", was a common ideology whose conceptual framework was revealed in this essay on transnational progressivism.

In his 2003 book entitled Where Did Social Studies Go Wrong? published by the Thomas B. Fordham Institute, Jonathan Burack, warned of the motivations of the transnationalist progressivist movement as defined by Fonte. According to the Hoover Institute, who archived the publication, Jonathan Burack was a "former secondary-school history and social studies teacher", who "produced curriculum materials in history from 1983 to 2003". Burack summarized Fonte's "transnational progressivism" as a reference to a "hostility toward the liberal democratic nation-state and its claims to sovereignty". Burack warned that "transnational progressives go well beyond traditional commitments to federalism and the separation of powers within a nation" by endorsing "postnational" citizenship. The global citizenship concept, Burack cautions is part of a movement that "seeks to shift authority to an institutional network of international organizations and subnational political actors not bound by any clear democratic, constitutional framework". By 2003, this world citizen view was not yet "dominant among classroom teachers" or in textbooks, but he warned that it was already a "dynamic theme pushing the social studies field forward". He warned that the embrace of global citizens is not merely the "celebration of diverse societies and cultures", but a path to destabilizing democracy as we know it. According to Burack, the transnational progressivism movement as defined by Fonte, via  the "global education advocates" focus on "global trends, transnational cultural interchanges, and worldwide problems, especially those that can be depicted as rendering the nation-state obsolete" with the goal of causing "Americans to doubt the ability of their national civic society to deal with global challenges."

In his October 2004 New Criterion article entitled "Gulliver's travails", John O'Sullivan used the metaphor of the United States as the fictional Gulliver in Jonathan Swift's 1726 satire Gulliver's Travels. Gulliver was tied down in a web woven by the much smaller Lilliputians—whose collaborative efforts to subdue the giant Gulliver, ultimately failed. O'Sullivan likened the "international community—that comfortable euphemism for the U.N., the WTO, the ICC, other U.N. agencies, and the massed ranks of NGOs" to the diminutive inhabitants of Lilliput pitted against the United States. The web used by this international community includes "international laws, regulations, and treaties, such as the Kyoto accords".

By 2008, Fonte had included American business leaders who supported "global governance", in his list of "post-American" "transnational pragmatists". Samuel Huntington has referred to them as "economic transnationals".

In a September 2016 AIE's John Yoo and Fonte, said that "democratic internationalism"—as outlined in the November 2012 Council on Foreign Relations (CFR) working paper—accurately describes what Yoo and Fonte call the "transnational-progressive agenda." In a 2018 CRB article, Fonte said that the Council on Foreign Relations was "central command for "liberal internationalism", more accurately described as "transnational progressivism."

The CFR paper by American political scientist Daniel Deudney and Princeton University politics and international affairs professor, G. John Ikenberry, said that "democratic internationalism" was a better strategy in 2012, than "American exceptionalism." "Democratic internationalism" "builds on and exploits the opportunities of a heavily democratic world,"  and because of its own long history of democratic reforms, the United States,  was "uniquely positioned to pursue a strategy of global democratic renewal". However, as of 2012, the U.S. had "failed to adapt to the end of the Cold War, the decline of the unipolar moment, and the end of American exceptionalism", according to the CFR paper. Yoo and Fonte criticized the CFR paper saying that it called for the reversal of the "Reagan-Thatcher fundamentalist capitalism" by "forging [of] transnational democratic progressive alliances".

In his 2019 book, The Sovereignty Wars , the CFR's Stewart Patrick, said that the strategy of "American exceptionalism" is used by sovereigntists who cite the uniqueness of the U.S. to "keep the U.S. apart from international rules, treaties, or institutions that they believe might infringe on U.S. sovereignty." The Congressional Sovereignty Caucus was launched in 2009, by Congressman Doug Lamborn. Its members were "concerned about the far-reaching implications of international treaties, such as the Comprehensive Test Ban Treaty (CTBT) and the United Nations Convention on the Rights of the Child, as they did not want American parents to lose their right to "discipline their children and send them to religious schools."

Fonte's 2002 description of transnational progressivism was included as a section of a 2020 commissioned report by United Kingdom-based historian, Tammy Lynn Nemeth—the "Nemeth Report" entitled "A New Global Paradigm: Understanding the Transnational Progressive Movement, the Energy Transition and the Great Transformation Strangling Alberta's Petroleum Industry". Nemeth was concerned about the role of the transnational progressive movement in the alleged anti-Alberta energy campaign targeting the Athabasca oil sands in the Canadian province of Alberta. The report was one of three commissioned by the Government of Alberta's "Public Inquiry into Anti-Alberta Energy Campaigns". In her report Nemeth, who completed her MA in Alberta and her PhD at the University of British Columbia, described the 2020 iteration of Fonte's 2002 concept. She said that her "timely" report reveals the "nature, motivations, objectives, and strategies of the Transnational Progressive Movement to force or manufacture an energy crisis. Nemeth warned that there has been a "comprehensive international assault on Alberta's and Canada's energy industry" by groups that promote "various Green New Deals around the world". Using the "media and the youth", these entities are pushing through a "cultural shift"—a new global paradigm"—also known as the "Great Transition", "Great Transformation”, and "Global Phase Shift". This, Nemeth warns that the Transnational Progressive Movement will "fundamentally transform the western industrial capitalist economic system" and "our modern way of life." According to Nemeth, this "progressive movement...abhors Alberta and the hydrocarbon industry" and "relishes the idea of their demise." Nemeth is critical of the way in which the Canadian federal government, academics, NGOs—and the foundations that fund them—use the "rationale of climate change" to nurture this "new global paradigm".

Transnational progressivism in the Progressive Era
Scholars who contributed to 2008 edited book, Britain and Transnational Progressivism—edited by David W. Gutzke—were referring to the historical Progressive Era in the late 1890s and early 20th century in the United States, Western Europe, the British Empire, and Japan, which was a period of activism and social reforms.  Australian historian Ian Tyrrell in describing "transatlantic progressivism" and the women's temperance movement, said that, in the early years of the movement, "American women saw the trans-Atlantic reform tradition as part of a larger potential for a global spread of Anglo-American values." While Princeton University's Daniel Rodgers, saw the transnational exchange of ideas as mainly originating in the United Kingdom. From 1903 onwards, campaigns for suffrage in Britain and the United States, saw a "reciprocal influence" as campaigns accelerated, according to Tyrrell.

Transnational progressivism in military science fiction
In the military science fiction The Tuloriad series' Legacy of the Aldenata by John Ringo and  Tom Kratman—who co-authored some of the series—the term "galactic tranzis" is used. Kratman said that his use of "tranzi" was an allegorical reference to the "Transnational Progressive's apparatus and dream" which had to be controlled and ultimately destroyed to prevent a "rather unpleasant future".

Notes

References

American culture
Cultural politics
Political terminology of the United States
2002 neologisms
Globalization
International relations theory
Political science terminology
Transnationalism
Criticism of multiculturalism